Montenegro has participated in the Eurovision Song Contest 12 times since its debut in .

History

The country placed 11th in the first semi-final in 2009, their best result at the time, with "Just Get Out of My Life" performed by Andrea Demirović. In November 2009, RTCG announced that Montenegro would withdraw from the  contest due to financial difficulties. Despite not participating, RTCG still broadcast the contest. RTCG applied to participate in the  contest, but with the caveat that the potential representative would have to find sponsors to fund their participation themselves. As that did not come to fruition, in December 2010, Montenegro decided to not participate in the contest on financial grounds.

On 20 November 2011 the head of RTCG revealed that Montenegro would participate in the 2012 contest to be held in Baku; he also went on to say that he saw Montenegro at every Eurovision Song Contest to come. In , Montenegro qualified for the grand final for the first time in its history with Sergej Ćetković's "Moj svijet". In , Montenegro again qualified for the grand final with "Adio", performed by Knez and composed by Željko Joksimović. The song achieved the best Montenegrin result up to that time, finishing in 13th place. In , RTCG selected Highway and their song "The Real Thing" internally. They performed in the first semi-final but the song failed to qualify, placing 13th with 60 points. In , RTCG selected Slavko Kalezić and his song "Space" internally. The song failed to qualify, placing 16th. In , RTCG organised the national final Montevizija to select their entry, which was won by "Inje" performed by Vanja Radovanović. The song failed to qualify from the second semi-final, placing 16th with 40 points. In , RTCG again selected its representative through Montevizija, which was won by "Heaven" performed by D mol. The song failed to qualify from the first semi-final, placing 16th with 46 points.

Despite initially confirming their participation in the  contest and aiming to expand Montevizija, Montenegro ultimately did not enter the contest, which was later cancelled as a result of the COVID-19 pandemic. RTCG later stated that the reason was due to "modest results" and financial issues. Once again, Montenegro failed to qualify for the final, finishing 17th in a field of 18 with 33 points in the second semi-final. RTCG later confirmed its absence from the  contest, citing financial constraints and a lack of interest from sponsors. Shortly after, Enisa Nikaj, who represented New York in the first American Song Contest, claimed that she was set to represent Montenegro in Eurovision with the song "Olé".

Participation overview 

Awards

Barbara Dex Award

The Barbara Dex Award was an annually awarded, fan-voted accolade for the "worst dressed" artists in the Eurovision Song Contest.

Related involvement

Heads of delegation
The public broadcaster of each participating country in the Eurovision Song Contest assigns a head of delegation as the EBU's contact person and the leader of their delegation at the event. The delegation, whose size can greatly vary, includes a head of press, the contestants, songwriters, composers and backing vocalists, among others.

Commentators and spokespersons

Gallery

See also
Montenegro in the Junior Eurovision Song Contest
Serbia and Montenegro in the Eurovision Song Contest
Yugoslavia in the Eurovision Song Contest

Notes and references

Notes

References

 
Countries in the Eurovision Song Contest